Super Secret Movie Rules is a 2004 television series of film commentaries produced by David Story on VH1.

Episodes

Slashers
Films referenced
The Texas Chain Saw Massacre
Halloween
Friday the 13th
A Nightmare on Elm Street
Hellraiser
Child's Play
Scream
I Know What You Did Last Summer
Scary Movie
Freddy vs. Jason
 Super Secret Movie Rules: "Slashers" on VH1.com.

Stupid and Stupider
Films referenced
Beavis and Butt-head Do America
Bill & Ted's Excellent Adventure
Dude, Where's My Car?
Kingpin
Pee-wee's Big Adventure
The Jerk
The Naked Gun
Wayne's World
Zoolander
 Super Secret Movie Rules: "Stupid and Stupider" on VH1.com.

Tear Jerkers
Films referenced
Love Story
The Champ
Ordinary People
Dying Young
Patch Adams
Sophie's Choice
Terms of Endearment
Mask
Ghost
The English Patient
 Super Secret Movie Rules: "Tear Jerkers" on VH1.com.

Superheroes
Films referenced
Superman
Batman
Darkman
The Crow
Blade
The Matrix
Unbreakable
Lara Croft: Tomb Raider
Hulk
 Super Secret Movie Rules: "Superheroes" on VH1.com.

Sports Underdogs
Films referenced
Rocky
The Karate Kid
Blue Crush
The Bad News Bears
The Mighty Ducks
Cool Runnings
Rudy
Varsity Blues
The Longest Yard
The Rookie
 Super Secret Movie Rules: "Sports Underdogs" on VH1.com.

Teen Sex Comedies
Films referenced
Animal House
Private School
Porky's
The Last American Virgin
Fast Times at Ridgemont High
Risky Business
Revenge of the Nerds
Sixteen Candles
Weird Science
American Pie
 Super Secret Movie Rules: "Teen Sex Comedies" on VH1.com.

Disaster Movies
Films referenced
Armageddon
The Towering Inferno
Alive
The Perfect Storm
Earthquake
Dante's Peak
Airport
Airplane!
The Core
Super Secret Movie Rules: "Disaster Movies" on VH1.com.

External links
 Super Secret Movie Rules on VH1.com.
 

VH1 original programming
2004 American television series debuts
2004 American television series endings